Shattered Galaxy is a massively multiplayer online real-time strategy game (MMORTS)  that was released in 2001 by  KRU Interactive., now known as Nexon Inc, after an extensive open beta period. In the US, it was published by Tri Synergy. It combines the attributes of a massive multiplayer online role-playing game and a real-time strategy game. Having won the Seumas McNally Grand Prize at the 2001 Independent Games Festival and hosted through the Game Developers Conference, the game has been commercially unsuccessful due in large part to its dated graphics engine. The game was published under the name Tactical Commanders in South Korea, published by Nexon until December 31, 2005. This game has also been serviced in Japan, Taiwan, and Germany.

Plot
Shattered Galaxy is set in a post-apocalyptic future.  A teleportation device was found buried on Earth's surface, though scientists were not able to master its secrets.  Various non-living substances were successfully sent through and retrieved, but when a common rat was inserted into the portal, it activated the artifact in an unexpected way: the device immediately teleported itself, as well as all matter in a 2000 kilometer wide radius around it, to the planet Morgana Prime.  The player is one of the survivors of this incident.  The planet itself was devoid of sentient life, but robotic war machines were found on its surface, and humans have since learned to control them telepathically (allowing the humans themselves to stay out of harm's way).  Humans have since expanded to another planet (server) in the Morgana system, Relic, where wars likewise rage.

Gameplay

Development
As of September 29, 2008, the game can be played using a basic account at no charge with a few minor handicaps or upgraded to an elite account at a cost of US$9.95 per month to play with all limitations removed.

Nexon has closed Tactical Commanders' service in Korea, Japan, and Taiwan. As of October 31, 2008, the German service was closed due to lack of players.

Reception

John Lee reviewed the PC version of the game for Next Generation, rating it three stars out of five, and stated that "If you'd like to capture chunks of pie-charted landscapes, this is a decent persistent online game. Teamwork required."

The game received "generally favorable reviews" according to the review aggregation website Metacritic.

Shattered Galaxy was a runner-up for The Electric Playgrounds "Best Independent PC Game" prize, but lost to Serious Sam: The First Encounter.

References

External links
 Official website
 

2001 video games
Massively multiplayer online real-time strategy games
Seumas McNally Grand Prize winners
Video games scored by Jesper Kyd
Video games developed in South Korea
Windows games
Windows-only games
Independent Games Festival winners
Tri Synergy games